Taihe Subdistrict is a subdistrict in Guandu District, Kunming, Yunnan, China. , it has eight residential neighborhoods under its administration:
Heping Road Community
Yongsheng Road Community
Mingtong Road Community
Qianwei Road Community
Shuanglongqiao Community
Huangjiazhuang Community
Wujing Community
Erjiawan Community

See also 
 List of township-level divisions of Yunnan

References 

Township-level divisions of Kunming